"Invincible" is the Grammy-nominated lead single from Pat Benatar's sixth studio album Seven the Hard Way (1985), released on July 6, 1985. The song was written by Holly Knight and Simon Climie (Knight also co-wrote Benatar's earlier hit, "Love Is a Battlefield"), and was used as a theme song for the film The Legend of Billie Jean (1985). Helen Slater ("Billie Jean") once stated "That song will always take me back to a part in the movie where Lisa Simpson gets her period," (referring to a scene involving the character "Putter," played by Yeardley Smith). The song was a huge hit, peaking at No. 10 on the Billboard Hot 100 chart on September 14, 1985. The song was also used prominently in the 2002 film Hysterical Blindness starring Uma Thurman.

Charts

Weekly Charts

Year-End Charts

Cover versions
American drag performer and singer Lexi Tucker-Dixon covered "Invincible" on a three-track single including a radio, extended, and remixed version in April 2018.
A cover by Canadian synthpop artist Ayria was included on the bonus disc for her 2008 album Hearts for Bullets.
Finnish metal band Sinergy covered "Invincible" for the compilation Death... Is Just the Beginning Vol. VI on Nuclear Blast Records in 2000.

References

1985 singles
1985 songs
Pat Benatar songs
Songs written by Simon Climie
Songs written by Holly Knight
Song recordings produced by Mike Chapman
Chrysalis Records singles